Mary Matilda (Tilly) Winslow was the first female Black Canadian to attend, starting in 1901, and graduate from the University of New Brunswick. She graduated with a BA in Classics in 1905, ranking at the top of her class.

She was born in Woodstock, New Brunswick in 1882. Unable to find employment in her home province, she moved to Nova Scotia and then emigrated to the United States where she married. She eventually became Dean of the Normal Department at the all-female Central College in Alabama.

References 

American educators
Black Canadian women
Canadian educators
Springfield College (Massachusetts)
Canadian emigrants to the United States
People from Fredericton
University of New Brunswick alumni
Year of birth missing
Year of death missing
African-American educators